Cellulosic sugars are derived from non-food biomass (e.g. wood, agricultural residues, municipal solid waste). The biomass is primarily composed of carbohydrate polymers cellulose, hemicellulose, and an aromatic polymer (lignin). The hemicellulose is a polymer of mainly five-carbon sugars C5H10O5 (xylose). and the cellulose is a polymer of six-carbon sugar C6H12O6 (glucose). Cellulose fibers are considered to be a plant’s structural building blocks and are tightly bound to lignin, but the biomass can be deconstructed using Acid hydrolysis, enzymatic hydrolysis, organosolv dissolution, autohydrolysis or supercritical hydrolysis. A more recent mechanical method offers hope that at last, a more economic and waste free method has been found although it is still to scale and is not yet commercial.

Biomass (cellulose, hemicellulose and lignocellulose) contain vast amounts of fermentable sugars. These sugars may be produced from a wide variety of feedstocks and can be converted into a multitude of biochemical, biofuel, and polymer products by either biological, mechanical  or chemical routes.



Industrial use

In January 2012, BASF invested in Pennsylvania-based Renmatix to produce low-cost, large volume quantities of industrial sugar from lignocellulosic biomass (wood, cane bagasse or straw). Renmatix is currently the only commercial player utilizing supercritical hydrolysis as a route to cellulosic sugar production.

Renmatix is working with multiple partners on development of commercial scale facilities with the capability to produce more than 100,000 tons of cellulosic sugars annually. The company has a world-class technical center in Pennsylvania and production operations at the Integrated Plantrose Complex (IPC) in Kennesaw, Georgia and the Feedstock Processing Facility (FPF) in Rome, New York.

In June 2013, Renmatix also entered a joint development agreement (JDA) with UPM, a Finnish pulp, paper and timber manufacturer, to convert woody biomass into low-cost sugar intermediates for subsequent downstream processing into biochemicals.

In December 2013, Renmatix and Virent announced a strategic collaboration to convert affordable cellulosic sugars to renewable chemicals and bio-based packaging materials.

In March 2015, French Energy Group, Total S.A. entered a joint development agreement (JDA) with Renmatix to use the Plantrose technology to extract second-generation sugars from biomass and develop sustainable and profitable biomolecules for products of interest.

Biotechnology Penetration in the Chemical Industry
 

World Biobased Market Penetration 2010-2025

In the first quarter of 2013, American Process Inc. announced the start-up of cellulosic sugar production using their patented AVAP® technology at their demonstration plant in Thomaston, GA. The AVAP process uses ethanol and sulfur dioxide (SO2) to fractionate biomass into its pure components: cellulose, hemicellulose sugars and lignin. 
In early 2013 GranBio, a Brazilian pioneer in biofuels and biochemicals, completed the acquisition of an equity investment in API.
Since that time, API has fermented both five-carbon and six-carbon sugars into high value bio-chemicals and biofuels in partnership with fermentation companies throughout the world.

Applications

Cellulosic sugars are used as renewable resources for biochemical and biofuels industries and can be used to produce intermediates by fermentative processes. The availability of industrial sugars from renewable resources, in sufficient quantities and at a favorable cost enables the products to be cost-competitive to fossil fuel based products.

A 2012 study by Nexant estimates that in the future, it will be possible and potentially economically viable to produce any type of sugar-based chemical product from biomass due to developments in cellulosic processing.

References

Biomass